Communauté d'agglomération de Saint-Dizier Der et Blaise is the communauté d'agglomération, an intercommunal structure, centred on the town of Saint-Dizier. It is located in the Haute-Marne and Marne departments, in the Grand Est region, northeastern France. Created in 2017, its seat is in Saint-Dizier. Its area is 929.7 km2. Its population was 56,395 in 2019, of which 22,928 in Saint-Dizier proper.

Composition
The communauté d'agglomération consists of the following 60 communes, of which 10 in the Marne department:

Allichamps
Ambrières
Attancourt
Bailly-aux-Forges
Bayard-sur-Marne
Bettancourt-la-Ferrée
Brousseval
Ceffonds
Chamouilley
Chancenay
Cheminon
Chevillon
Curel
Domblain
Dommartin-le-Franc
Doulevant-le-Petit
Éclaron-Braucourt-Sainte-Livière
Eurville-Bienville
Fays
Fontaines-sur-Marne
Frampas
Hallignicourt
Hauteville
Humbécourt
Landricourt
Laneuville-à-Rémy
Laneuville-au-Pont
La Porte du Der
Louvemont
Magneux
Maizières
Maurupt-le-Montois
Moëslains
Montreuil-sur-Blaise
Morancourt
Narcy
Osne-le-Val
Perthes
Planrupt
Rachecourt-sur-Marne
Rachecourt-Suzémont
Rives Dervoises
Roches-sur-Marne
Saint-Dizier
Saint-Eulien
Saint-Vrain
Sapignicourt
Sommancourt
Sommevoire
Thilleux
Trois-Fontaines-l'Abbaye
Troisfontaines-la-Ville
Valcourt
Valleret
Vaux-sur-Blaise
Ville-en-Blaisois
Villiers-en-Lieu
Voillecomte
Vouillers
Wassy

References

Saint-Dizier
Saint-Dizier
Saint-Dizier